Torrevieja is a seaside city and municipality located on the Costa Blanca in the province of Alicante, in the southern part of the Valencian Community, on the southeastern Mediterranean coast of Spain.
 
Torrevieja lies about 50 kilometres south of the city of Alicante and had a population of 90,097 at the 2011 Census; the latest official estimate (for 2019) is 83,337. Torrevieja was originally a salt-mining and fishing village as it is located between the sea and two large salt pink lakes, known as Las Salinas de Torrevieja.

History
Until 1802, Torrevieja existed only as an ancient guard tower, which gave the town its name (Torre Vieja, Spanish, meaning 'Old Tower') and some labourers' cottages.  But in 1803, Charles IV authorised the movement of the salt production offices from La Mata to the town itself and allowed the construction of dwellings there.  In 1829, the town was totally destroyed by an earthquake, but the basins were soon reconstructed and re-opened. In 1931, Alfonso XIII gave Torrevieja city status by special grant. During this period, there was also a growing market for flax, hemp and cotton.

In the 19th century, the salt was mainly shipped from the town by Swedish and Dutch ships. At the time, there was only limited demand from other regions of Spain, mainly Galicia and to a lesser extent, Valencia.  Although by the dawn of the 20th century, a quarter of all the salt harvested from the lagoon in Torrevieja was sold in Spain itself, and the rest was exported to foreign markets. Today, it is still an important industry in Torrevieja and a major employer. The city has a Museum of Sea and Salt.

Recent history
 
In recent years the local economy has hugely expanded due to the tourism industry. This includes both a strong contingent of British, Irish, Germans and Scandinavians, many of whom live there all year round, and Spanish people who have a second home in the city. By 2004, Torrevieja had the largest number of British residents of all Spanish municipalities (approx. 7,180). The high number of British expatriates has led to Torrevieja being nicknamed as the 'Costa del Yorkshire' by some holidaymakers and paella can be found served in giant Yorkshire puddings in many of the city's restaurants.

Since 2001, the city's authorities, along with Random House's Spanish subsidiary, Plaza & Janés, award Spain's second most important annual literary award, the {{lang|es|Premio de Novela Ciudad de Torrevieja, and its poetry correlative, {{lang|es|Premio de Poesía Ciudad de Torrevieja.

Climate
Köppen-Geiger climate classification system classifies its climate as hot semi-arid (BSh), with dry, mild winters and hot, very dry summers. October is the wettest month.

Population
In 1991, the city had 25,000 residents, two decades later close to 100,000. The father of the expansion was Pedro Ángel Hernández Mateo, mayor between 1988 and 2011. In order to encourage growth, all the land was rezoned fit for building, save for the two lagoons, designated natural parks in 1989.

The INE (Spanish Census) of 2005 showed that the city had 84,838 residents, and the ajuntament (district council area) had 95,531 residents. By January 2008 this figure had reached 103,154 of whom only 47,870 were Valencian or Spanish. However, by the 2011 census, the population had reduced to 90,097 and the latest estimate (for the start of 2019) is 83,337.

The most prominent nationalities in 2012 were:

Politics
PP however narrowly lost its absolute majority in 2015 to a coalition of five parties which designated Green candidate José Manuel Dolón García mayor.

Transport
Torrevieja's main road link is the N-332 road linking Cartagena with Valencia hugging the Mediterranean coastline. There was once a branch line from the Alicante–Murcia railway serving Torrevieja; which closed in the late 1970s. There are plans to reopen this line.

Places of interest

 (Archpriest's Parish Church of the Immaculate Conception) – erected in 1789 and reconstructed in 1844, using stones reclaimed from the original  (Old Tower)
Panoramic viewpoint , old watchtower
 (La Mata), constructed in 1896
, dyke or breakwater of Levante, 1600 m long
 (Park of the Nations), scale map of the European continent
 (Museum of the Sea and Salt)
Submarine S-61 Delfin Floating Museum
Albatros III Patrol Boat Floating Museum
 – served as a storehouse and wharf for salt from 1777 until 1958
 – the two salt lagoons to the west of the city, Nature Park of the Lagoons of La Mata and Torrevieja
Friday street market – As of May 2017, the market has moved to a new location outside of the city centre, near Aquapolis
 – a semi-outdoor shopping mall
Carrefour Torrevieja hypermarket
 – Local natural park – waterwheel park in La Mata
 (music hall)
 (Virgen del Carmen Cultural Centre)
 (Torrevieja Municipal Theatre)
International Music Auditorium of Torrevieja
 (museum dedicated to Ricardo Lafuente, composer of Habanera songs)
Museum of Easter (Holy Week Museum 'Tomás Valcárcel')
Old Railway Station – houses Torrevieja Natural History Museum
Cultural Society of Torrevieja Casino – Mozarabic style interior from the 1880s
Water fountains
Seaside esplanade 'Juan Aparicio'

Natural swimming pools at the Juan Aparicio promenade
 Aquapolis, water park

Notable people
Joaquín Chapaprieta (1871–1951), politician
Fourmidables, an a cappella singing quartet (2008)
Nicola Kuhn, tennis player

Notes

References

External links

Ayuntamiento de Torrevieja (Spanish)
Torrevieja City Guide (Ingles)

Municipalities in the Province of Alicante
Seaside resorts in Spain
Populated coastal places in Spain